The 2020  Jordanian Pro League (known as the Al-Manaseer Jordanian Pro League, named after Ziad AL-Manaseer Companies Group for sponsorship reasons) was the 68th season of Jordanian Pro League since its inception in 1944. The season started on 5 March, but was put on hold due to COVID-19 pandemic in Jordan then finished in 2021.

Al-Faisaly are the defending champions of the 2018–19 season. Ma'an and Sahab joined as the promoted clubs from the 2018–19 League Division 1. They replaced Al-Baqa'a and That Ras who were relegated to the 2020 League Division 1.

Teams 
Twelve teams will compete in the league – the top ten teams from the 2018–19 season and the two teams promoted from the 2018–19 Division 1.

Teams promoted to the 2020 Premier League

Sahab and Ma'an Both promoted, following Sahab 1–0 defeat against Ma'an on 29 April 2019 before the last day of the regular season. Ma'an playing in the Premier League for the first time in their history.

Teams relegated to the 2020 Division 1

The first team to be relegated was Al-Baqa'a, following their 1–2 defeat against Al-Ahli on 9 May 2019, ending their 18-years stay in the top flight.

The second team to be relegated was That Ras, ending their 7-years stay in the top flight.

Stadiums and locations 
Note: Table lists in alphabetical order.

Personnel and kits

Foreign players

League table

Results

Season progress

Statistics

Scoring 
First goal of the season:   Wissam Abu Daabis for Ma'an against Al-Salt (5 March 2020)
Last goal of the season:   Ahmad Ersan for Al-Faisaly against Al-Wehdat (16 January 2021)

Top scorers

Hat-tricks

References 

Jordanian Pro League seasons
2019–20 in Jordanian football
Jordan Premier League
Jordanian Premier League, 2020